Gusan Station is a railway station on Line 6 of the Seoul Subway located at Gusan-dong, Eunpyeong-gu, Seoul, South Korea. This station is part of the one-way section of Line 6 known as the Eungam Loop.

Station layout

Exits
 Exit 3 : Gusan Market

References

Metro stations in Eunpyeong District
Seoul Metropolitan Subway stations
Railway stations opened in 2000